Founded in 1974, the mission of the Dahlem Konferenzen was "to promote the interdisciplinary exchange of scientific information and ideas, to stimulate international cooperation in research, and to plan and organize workshops on topics of international interest and suitable for an interdisciplinary approach." Topics were drawn from the natural, physical and social sciences and the humanities. Its name derived from the Berlin suburb of Dahlem, home to the Free University of Berlin, several Max Planck Institutes, scientific federal institutes, and museums.

Background

In the 1970s, when the city of Berlin was still divided, an initiative began within Germany's scientific community to draw scholars back to Berlin. This led to the establishment of the Dahlem Konferenzen in 1974, founded by the Stifterverband für die Deutsche Wissenschaft (the science foundation of German industry, trade, and commerce). Funding was provided by the Stifterverband and the Deutsche Forschungsgemeinschaft (the German research foundation).  Initially financed by the Stifterverband as a 5-yr project group, two funding extensions were granted due to its initial success. In 1989, however, the Stifterverband needed to find a permanent home for the Dahlem Konferenzen. Resolving this was complicated by the German Reunification in 1989, with staff facing termination.  Ultimately, Dahlem Konferenzen was integrated into the Free University of Berlin in 1990.

Silke Bernhard served as its founding director from 1974 to 1989, followed by Jennifer Altman (interim, 1990–1991), Klaus Roth (1991-2000), and Julia Lupp (2000-2006). In 1987, Dahlem Konferenzen celebrated its 50th workshop and by 2010 it had convened 100 workshops.

After Reunification, the Free University struggled to finance the workshops. In addition, tension developed between the Scientific Advisory Board of the Dahlem Konferenzen and university administrators, when the university made changes to the original mission. The Board felt that these changes would compromise the international reputation of the series. To push forward these changes, university administrators removed Julia Lupp in 2004, and many prominent scientists on the Board resigned in protest. Although Lupp was later reinstated in a modified role, under the supervision of Prof. Dr. Werner Reuter, the changes remained in place and concerned scientists began to search for alternatives.

In 2006, the influential neuroscientist Prof. Dr. Wolf Singer and Lupp established the Ernst Strüngmann Forum within the Frankfurt Institute for Advanced Studies. As Singer stated at the time: "I felt the Dahlem Conference was not what it used to be, so I started looking for financing for a new forum." "The  Ernst Strüngmann Forum took off like a phoenix rising from the ashes. Since then, it has embedded itself within the scientific community, earning the reputation as the place where intellectual dead ends are overcome, where new ways of conceptualizing issues are grasped, and where future collaborations are created” (from The History of Neuroscience in Autobiography, vol. 9, p. 476).

The Free University of Berlin discontinued the workshops in 2012. The exact circumstances of this decision are not known.

Format
Originally, each workshop followed the Dahlem Workshop Structure. In her opening statements, Silke Bernhard would encourage participants "to discuss what you don't know." A number of participants were asked to write background papers, which reviewed the field rather than individual work. Lectures were not given. Small group discussions marked the week-long meeting and resulted in group reports that reflected "the current knowledge in the field and suggestions for future research."

Results of each workshop were published in an edited volume by the following publishers: Abakon Verlagsgesellschaft, Verlag-Chemie, Springer, Wiley & Sons, Dahlem University Press, MIT Press and deGruyter.

Originally, the workshops took place in the Europa Center, located downtown in West Berlin next to the Kaiser Wilhelm Memorial Church. Later venues included the Villa Linde, the Japanese Embassy in the Tiergarten, the Harnack House, and various buildings at the Free University of Berlin.

The Dahlem Workshop Structure underwent change over the years, most notably as of 2004.

Conferences
A list of all conferences is available. Some years were missed.

  Source: Free University Berlin

References

International conferences in Germany
Free University of Berlin